Hermann Kohlmeyer (1814 – 1883) was the rabbi of Congregation Shangarai Chasset in New Orleans, Louisiana.

On January 17, 1847, the synagogue board unanimously elected Kohlmeyer to serve as its leader. In the edition of The Occident and American Jewish Advocate that noted the appointment, Isaac Leeser praised Kohlmeyer as a worthy individual for the position, and expressed hope that Kohlmeyer would be successful.

Noted as a brilliant scholar and linguist, Rabbi Isaac Meyer Wise recommended Kohlmeyer to serve on the rabbinical committee that was to examine Wise's Minhag America Reform prayer book. But Kohlmeyer gave up his ministry for a career in education, becoming professor of Hebrew and Oriental Literature at the University of Louisiana (now Tulane University).

Although his service to the Jewish community seems to have been relatively short in length, it appears that his descendants remained in New Orleans, and have been prominent members of the New Orleans community since then.

References
 Kahn, Catherine C. and Lachoff, Irwin. The Jewish Community of New Orleans. (Arcadia Publishing 2005) .
 Adams, Herbert Baxter Contributions to American Educational History (Government Printing Office 1898)
 The Occident and American Jewish Advocate

American Orthodox rabbis
People from New Orleans
1814 births
1883 deaths
Place of birth unknown
Place of death unknown
19th-century American rabbis